Mark Alan Williamson (born July 21, 1959) is a retired professional baseball player who played pitcher in the Major Leagues from 1987 to 1994. He played for the Baltimore Orioles. On April 29, 1988, Williamson pitched 6 shutout innings to help the Orioles defeat the White Sox 9-0. The victory snapped the Orioles 21 game losing streak that started the 1988 season. On July 13, 1991, he pitched a no hitter along with Bob Milacki, Mike Flanagan, and Gregg Olson against the Oakland Athletics.

As of 2018, Mark is a real estate broker in the San Diego, CA suburbs.

References

External links

1959 births
Living people
Major League Baseball pitchers
Baseball players from Texas
Baltimore Orioles players
Hagerstown Suns players
Sportspeople from Corpus Christi, Texas
Beaumont Golden Gators players
Las Vegas Stars (baseball) players
Reno Padres players
Rochester Red Wings players